Veronika Chvojková (born 31 March 1987) is a Czech former professional tennis player.

Her career-high singles ranking is No. 250, achieved on 26 May 2008, and highest doubles ranking is No. 172, achieved on 26 February 2007. She won one ITF singles title and eight ITF doubles titles.

ITF finals

Singles (1–2)

Doubles (8–10)

External links
 
 

Living people
1987 births
People from Benešov
Czech female tennis players
Sportspeople from the Central Bohemian Region